Pallickal Nooranadu is a village in Kerala, India. Its ancient name was "Kallappanchira". Pallickal is in Pathanamthitta district.

References 

Villages in Pathanamthitta district